The 6th Korea Drama Awards is an awards ceremony for excellence in television in South Korea. It was held at the Grand Performance Hall – Kyungnam Culture and Arts Center in Jinju, South Gyeongsang Province on October 2, 2013 and hosted by Dal Shabet's Subin and announcer Oh Sang-jin. The nominees were chosen from Korean dramas that aired from September 2012 to August 2013.

Nominations and winners
(Winners denoted in bold)

References

External links 
  
 6th Korea Drama Awards  at Daum 

Korea Drama Awards
Korea Drama Awards
Korea Drama Awards